"New York City" is a song by American singer Lenny Kravitz, written by Kravitz and Craig Ross. The song was released on October 21, 2014, as the third single from the Kravitz's tenth studio album Strut.

Video
The music video was shot by photographer and director Francesco Carrozzini. The video premiered exclusively via Vevo. In the video Kravitz walks around New York, from Harlem to Soho to Brooklyn to Coney Island—as his fans gather around him with their mobile phones.

Reception
Marcus Floyd of Renowned for Sound wrote that "New York City" is "six minutes and twenty-three seconds of classic rock n' roll that's addictive".

Charts

References

Lenny Kravitz songs
2014 songs
Songs written by Lenny Kravitz
Songs written by Craig Ross